István Mitring (born 5 September 1969 in Hungary) is a Hungarian retired footballer.

References

Living people
Association football goalkeepers
1969 births
Hungarian footballers
People from Mosonmagyaróvár
Fehérvár FC players
BFC Siófok players
Kuopion Palloseura players
Myllykosken Pallo −47 players
Sportspeople from Győr-Moson-Sopron County